Best Friends Forever is an American sitcom television series that ran on NBC from April 4, to June 1, 2012. The series aired during the 2011–12 NBC primetime season as a mid-season replacement and was created by real-life best friends Lennon Parham and Jessica St. Clair. The pilot episode was made available early through Hulu and NBC.com on March 21, 2012. NBC officially canceled the series on May 11, 2012, after only 4 episodes were broadcast.

Series synopsis
When Jessica's (Jessica St. Clair) husband files for divorce, she flies across the country to seek comfort and move back in with her best friend Lennon (Lennon Parham). However, Lennon's boyfriend Joe (Luka Jones) has recently moved in and has a hard time fitting into Lennon and Jessica's close friendship.

Cast and characters
 Lennon Parham as Lennon Walker, Jessica's best friend and old roommate, living in New York City.
 Jessica St. Clair as Jessica Black, Lennon's best friend who moves back in with Lennon and her boyfriend after getting recently divorced.
 Luka Jones as Joe Foley, Lennon's live-in boyfriend.
 Stephen Schneider as Rav Stark, Jessica's old friend, who has unresolved feelings for Jessica.
 Daija Owens as Queenetta Carpenter, Jessica and Lennon's precocious nine-year-old neighbor.

Development and production
NBC placed a pilot order on February 7, 2011. The series was created by Lennon Parham and Jessica St. Clair with the pilot directed by Fred Savage. The series was executive produced by Jessica St. Clair, Lennon Parham, Scot Armstrong, Alexa Junge, Fred Savage and Ravi Nandan and the production company's Universal Media Studios and American Work.

NBC ordered the pilot to series on May 13, 2011 as a midseason entry in the 2011–12 United States network television schedule. Six episodes were produced for the first season. Adam Pally originally played the role of Joe, Parham's boyfriend, in the pilot, however with ABC renewing Pally's other show Happy Endings, the role was recast. On August 12, 2011, Luka Jones was cast in the role of Joe, replacing Pally.

On April 27, 2012, it was announced that NBC has pulled the series off their schedule "indefinitely", leaving two of the six filmed episodes left unaired. Parham stated a desire to post the remaining episodes online. However, on May 1, 2012 NBC announced that they would air the remaining episodes on Friday June 1, 2012.

Episodes

References

External links
 
 

2010s American single-camera sitcoms
2012 American television series debuts
2012 American television series endings
English-language television shows
NBC original programming
Television series about couples
Television series by Universal Television
Television shows set in New York City